The A486 is an A road in Wales linking New Quay, Ceredigion, with the A484 in Saron (Llangeler), Carmarthenshire.

Route
The road begins in New Quay near the waterfront area and (north to south) passes through or by the settlements of:
Maenygroes
Cross Inn
Synod Inn (junction with A487 and B4338)
Capel Cynon
Ffostrasol
Croes-Lan
Horeb (junction with A475)
Llandysul (bypassed, junction with B4624)
Dolgran
Pentrecwrt
The A486 finishes at the junction with the A484 in Saron.  

Roads in Wales
Transport in Carmarthenshire